You Won't Ever Be Lonely is the debut studio album by American country music singer Andy Griggs, released in 1999 via RCA Nashville. Four singles were top 20 hits on the Billboard Hot Country Singles & Tracks (now Hot Country Songs) charts between 1999 and 2000: "You Won't Ever Be Lonely", "I'll Go Crazy", "She's More", and "You Made Me That Way". The album has been certified Gold by the RIAA.

Two Waylon Jennings songs are covered on this album as well: "Shine on Me" and "Ain't Livin' Long Like This", the former of which also features Jennings as a duet partner.

Track listing

Personnel
As listed in liner notes.
Richard "Spady" Brannan – bass guitar
Jessi Colter – background vocals
Charles Cushman – 5-string banjo
Stuart Duncan – fiddle
Larry Franklin - fiddle, mandolin
Paul Franklin – pedal steel guitar, lap steel guitar
Andy Griggs – lead vocals, background vocals
Waylon Jennings – background vocals
Jeff King – acoustic guitar, electric guitar
Paul Leim – drums, percussion
B. James Lowry – acoustic guitar
Larry Marrs - background vocals
Jerry McPherson – electric guitar
Jimmy Nichols – piano, keyboards, background vocals
Russ Pahl – acoustic guitar, electric guitar
Tammy Sullivan – background vocals
Curtis Wright – background vocals
Curtis Young – background vocals
Reggie Young – acoustic guitar, electric guitar

Chart performance

Weekly charts

Year-end charts

Singles

Certifications

References

1999 debut albums
Albums produced by David Malloy
Andy Griggs albums
RCA Records albums